Polymodal is having multiple modes or modalities. Examples include:

 Polymodality, multiple stimulus modalities (e.g. free nerve endings)
 Polytonality, multiple musical modes